George Auckland is a UK television and digital media executive, who had a long career at the BBC. During his time as a BBC executive he worked on some of the key educational landmarks in British interactive media including the BBC Micro computer and the BBC Networking Club.   He also set up the BBC's first web production unit which was responsible for award winning websites such as Teletubbies, Bitesize, and produced many of the BBC's early TV programmes about home computing and the Internet.

Auckland graduated from Durham University (Hatfield College) with a degree in Applied Physics in 1969. He then joined the BBC as a trainee in the Film Department shortly after graduation.  During the three-day week he had to get special permission to use electricity. He went on to develop a career as a TV producer and programmes from Blue Peter to award-winning adult education shows including Johnny Ball's Think of a Number.  In December 1989 he received a Royal Television Society award for Take Nobody's Word For It (Vermeer episode) with Hendrik Ball, the award being in the 'adult/continuing education general audience (1988)' category.

In spring 1996 Auckland helped create the BBC Education Website, and in 1999 became head of a new department: Digital Media, which won the Royal Television Society, Educational Television, 1999 Judge's Award in (received in 2000) for BBC Education Online. Auckland was known at the BBC for his embrace of new technology, once teaching himself HTML in a space of 24 hours in 1996. He ran the Innovations Unit within BBC Learning (formerly BBC Interactive Factual and Learning) until March 31, 2011 when he retired from the BBC after 41 and a half years of service.

In 2007 he received the 2006 RTS Lifetime Achievement Award at the RTS Educational Awards.

In 2015 George was awarded the President of the NHK Prize for his "outstanding contributions to lifelong learning both through TV and Online".

The Domesday Project 

Auckland worked on Domesday Reloaded from 1 March 2011 to 31 March 2012. This is a project which is involved with the preservation and conversion of the Domesday Project.  He has given talks about this in the past and the many copyright issues at the Computer Conservation Society.

References 

BBC executives
Year of birth missing (living people)
Living people
British television producers
Alumni of Hatfield College, Durham